Animalia is an animated children's television series based on the 1986 picture book of the same name by illustrator Graeme Base. The series premiered on Network Ten in Australia on November 11, 2007, airing two seasons before ending on November 7, 2008.

Plot
The series tells the story of two human children, Alex and his friend Zoe, who stumble into the magical library which transports them to the animal-inhabited world of Animalia. Strange events have undermined the Animalian civilization, and Alex and Zoe join forces with their new friends G'Bubu the gorilla and Iggy the iguana to save Animalia from evil and comical villains.

Characters

Humans
 Alex (Brooke Mikey Anderson) is a natural artist and is hardly ever seen without a sketchbook and pencil. He keeps a cool level head and is rather enthusiastic with a sense of adventure; he's also athletic and can jump very well. His ability to see forgotten portals that can transport anyone anywhere in Animalia is what makes him special.
 Zoe (Katie Leigh) is a sassy and smart-mouthed but benevolent and jolly girl, Zoe met Alex by accident where she followed him to the world of Animalia. Despite a rocky start, she found a friend in Alex, who she refers to as "Sketch Boy." She is a very good storyteller, as evidenced in "Over and Beyond".
 Stanley is the Librarian of the Metro Library. He made his appearances in "Hello, We must be Going", "Goodbye, We Must Be Staying", "Whistling in the Dark", "Paradise Found", "Back to the Present" and "What the World Needs Now". He is Livingstone's human counterpart, and a close friend to him.
 Emma is Zoe's friend. Although she's not shown on-screen, she is heard in Zoe's PDA when she's calling her. Emma is heard in "Goodbye, We Must Be Staying". She often doesn't believe Zoe that Animalia exists.

Animalians
Note: In a nod to the book, the names of all the Animalians begin with the first letter of their species name.

 G'Bubu (Chris Hobbs)  is a large, green gorilla who lives in his tree house home with his best friend Iggy. Still a teenager himself, G'Bubu is fun-loving and enjoys monkeying around. Despite this, he still has a sense of acumen, be it about Animalia or his family tree. He was shown to have a fear of frogs in "The Mists of Time", but conquered it when Alex, Zoe and Iggy were eaten by giant frogs (saying that "sometimes, you can't let the fear get in the way of what you've got to do!").
 Iggy (Robert Mark Klein) is a Castilian iguana with a slightly excitable personality. He thinks himself to be bigger than anyone else, but always gets ahead of himself. He and G'Bubu were the first to befriend Alex and Zoe when they first arrived and are always on hand to help their new friends with any problem. He also has romantic feelings for Zoe. Later in the series, his voice has been changed. In "Don Iguana", he tries to prove his bravery to Zoe by disguising himself as Don Iguana, D'Avenger of Animalia. He can camouflage and change the color of his body due to being part chameleon via his grandfather.
 Livingstone T. Lion (Chris Hobbs) is the youthful leader of Animalia and the Keeper of the Core. He is one of the main protagonists of the TV series. He has a vast knowledge of the Core itself and just about everything and everyone in Animalia. He can be gentle, helpful and is always up for a game, but sometimes he is rather self-deprecating, wondering whether he can manage to bring Animalia back on track with its unstable Core.
 Reenie (Peta Johnson) is a Scottish black rhinoceros. She works at Animalia's Great Library and helps Livingstone with keeping the Core stable whenever something goes wrong. Almost as smart as Livingstone and just as friendly, Reenie has a big heart with room for everyone, but also claims to have a "love friend" named Rumble.
 Allegra (Kate Higgins) is a teenage American alligator who lives in the swamps. Allegra is a self-loving and snappy creature who is very protective of her land. She dreams of being a singer, but the others find that unlikely due to her terrible voice, except for her two gal pals, Bitzy and Snitzy, who constantly follow Allegra and admire her thoughts. Her singing improved when Zoe taught her in "Animalia's Talent-o-Topia" and she's been better ever since. Her catchphrase is "dang-a-lang!", which she utters at some point in almost every episode.
 Tyrannicus (Dean O'Gorman) is a sly smooth-talking tiger who serves as the main antagonist, Tyrannicus feels he should be ruler of Animalia rather than Livingstone. He finds ways of getting ahead by the use of various get-rich-quick schemes. He despises Alex and Zoe, who he refers to as "stink bugs" and especially wants to get rid of them. He is known also trying to get G'Bubu and Iggy out of Animalia. He is assisted by Fuchsia the fox.
 Fuchsi (Katie Leigh)  is a French red fox with pink fur and Tyrannicus's assistant; always sent to help him arrange or develop plans, she is very intelligent. She serves as a secondary antagonist in the TV series. Fuchsia is often reluctant to help Tyrannicus carry out his plans. She respects her boss, even though she often seems amused by Tyrannicus' actions, she also gets slightly annoyed at him.
 Elni (Peta Johnson) & Erno (Chris Hobbs) are the two friendly Australian Elephants who run the Elephants Eatery, the local restaurant for all Animalians. Elni's warm personality makes her lovable by all, while Erno's cooking is something worth trying, despite his tendency to panic.
 Herry & Horble (known as the "Horrible Hogs") Dean O'Gorman and Robert Mark Klein) are Cockney warthogs who are a little crass at times. They are a duo of criminals. They are mostly seen riding on their large motorcycles, specially equipped with loud speakers that play music (usually Wagner) wherever they go. Most of the time, they normally did deeds or followed orders for either Allegra or Tyrannicus. Sometimes, they were arrested and jailed.
 Melba & Melford are the main news reporters on Animalia News, broadcasting all of the current news and happenings on Fluttervision. Melba is more level-headed and calm, whereas Melford is slightly more neurotic and rather slow thinking Klein) 
 Zee and Zed are Texan Zebras who ride in their large zeppelin-like balloon, giving the low-down on Animalia from a bird's eye view. While Zed has a level head on his shoulders, Zee is very excitable and sometimes can't stop herself talking excitedly.
 Bitsy & Snitzy are Allegra's two female friends who do whatever she says. They're the only ones who respect Allegra's singing before Zoe taught her how.
 Victor & Verbal are introduced in "Forget Me Not", they are a vulture comedy double act: Victor, a Jewish sounding comedian, and his wisecracking partner, Verbal, who acts as his ventriloquist dummy for the bit. They're hugely popular not for the fact that they're vegetarians, unlike normal vultures, but for the fact that their years of hilarious stand-ups have made them an unforgettable duo.
 Rombolt is a Black Rhino and the head boss of the Fluttervision Office. Rombolt made his first appearance in "Animalia's Talent-O-Topia".
 The Giraffe has appeared as a character in several episodes of Animalia. However the Giraffes appearances are all background and brief with no speaking lines at all, it is currently unknown what gender the Giraffe is.
 The Creeper (Joey Lotsko) is an  antagonist who was once part of the Community Team until he was banished for using the secret portals to steal from the Animalians' homes. During the series' run, the form of the Creeper turns out to be a long-tailed weasel, who ended up lost in his own portals. Alex comes across him one day and, masquerading as "TC", the Creeper is freed without Alex realizing who he is. The Creeper, whose real name is Wooster Q. Weasel, plans to overthrow Animalia by taking control over the Core. The Creeper is a main character in all of his appearances, except "Iggy's Quest" because he only appeared in Iggy's nightmare. At the end of the series, he is defeated when Livingstone touches the Core, which the Creeper was still inside of, causing him to be shot out like a Core-spore, into the Wind of No Return. He was an associate of Tyrannicus (who often refers to him as Wheez) early in the series.
 The Toucans (Robert Mark Klein) are a colorful band of birds who, whenever they talk, speak only one word in every sentence (the reason behind this is never revealed or discussed). Sometimes they get the words mixed up and confuse their sentences, sometimes having disastrous results; this was especially evident in "Long Story Short".
 Butterflies – In the world of Animalia, rather than television sets, the residents watch Fluttervision. Large beautiful butterflies fly from home to home and arrange themselves as a large screen where the Animalians can watch the latest happenings from the Animalian news. They only do this for a short time as they do get worn out if watched for too long. They were seized by Tyrannicus Tiger in the episode "Butterfly Winter".
 Peter Applebottom (Chris Hobbs) is a mad gorilla scientist. He is mentioned in "Righting the Writing" by G'Bubu. He made his first appearance is "Being Peter Applebottom". Unfortunately for G'Bubu, Applebottom is from the past, and because G'Bubu got hit on the head by a bongo berry nut, he was brainwashed into thinking he's Peter Applebottom (through "Bongobeania", an amnesia-like condition in which not only do you forget who you are, you think you are someone else) so it's true that it's his first appearance.
 Dagmont Dragon is a protagonist who first appears in the episode "Over and Beyond" who captured Zee and Zed Zebra.
 Whim (Peta Johnson) is a unicorn in Over and Beyond. She made her first appearance in "Over and Beyond". When Zoe and Iggy touched her horn, they got transferred back to Animalia, which she didn't know.
 Carmine Chameleon is Iggy's grandfather.
 Echo Elephant is Elni and Erno's daughter.
 Hope and Harmony Hogs are a pair of warthog sisters who are far more ladylike then their male kin, enjoying skipping through the jungle. They are the love interests of Herry and Horble, who they appear to like, despite briefly falling for G'Bubu and Iggy.
 Blue Cap Nut Mice
 Mail Snail is a snail who serves as the Animalian equivalent of a mailman, but is extremely slow, often taking years to get the letter to the recipient. A running gag is when the characters complain of the lateness, he replies with the words "Give me a break. It's snail mail".

Corespore types
There have been many different types of Corespores throughout the series, each causing a wide variety of adverse effects on Animalia and its inhabitants when they blast off from the Core (with the exception of the Superspore).

Memory spore: This makes all Animalians lose their memories. Seen in Forget Me Not. Symbolized by a compass.
Rhyme spore: This makes all Animalians have to speak in rhyme; those who can't find a rhyme for something literally end up stuck for a rhyme. Seen in Catcher in the Rhyme. Symbolized by a ring that, when spun, gives the protagonists a clue to find a plant that rhymes with Animalia. A similar ring found later on also gives them advice on how to free those stuck for a rhyme.
Time spore: Causes time to randomly loop, slow down, or stop. Seen in The Mist of Time. Symbolized by a pocket watch. A recurring gag in that episode is the sweet aroma in the past.	
Nature spore: Causes all nature to slowly dry up and get extinct. Seen in Iggy's Quest. Symbolized by a shell. The Nature Spirits flew all around Animalia because that spore caused Mother Nature to be trapped in a portal, so the Nature Spirits couldn't get home.	
Cooperation spore: Causes Animalians to become uncooperative towards one another. Seen in The Call to Action. Symbolized by gears.
Generosity spore: Causes Animalians to become consumed by material greed. Seen in Alex's Treasure Island. Symbolized by a rainbow. This Corespore wasn't figured out until the very end (as generosity is the opposite of greed).	
Truth spore: Causes Animalians to lie and written truth to disappear. Seen in Nothing But The Truth. Symbolized by a snowflake.
Writing spore: This makes all the writing in Animalia disappear. Seen in Righting The Writing. Symbolized by a bill of rights book.
Deep thought spore: This corespore causes all Animalians to not think clearly. It is seen in The Ballad of the Creeper, and is symbolized by an orange light bulb. This is one of only two corespores to be corrupted by the Creeper's Corespore Contaminator, which made a fake blue light bulb (which is a rock and vines). According to Peter Applebottom it can be changed in many ways like making everyone yodel, non-stopping hopping around, or turn Animalians (except G'bubu's species) into babbling ninnies, including Alex and Zoe. The Creeper himself did not realize that even he was not immune to this.	
Hope spore: Causes Animalians to lose hope. Appears in Whistling in the Dark. Symbolized by seeds of hope.	This was also corrupted by the Creeper, but the effects were gradually reversed following the birth of Echo.
Portal spore: A spore lost long ago that lets all Animalians see the portals. Mentioned in Tunnel Vision.	
Word spore: This makes all Animalians forget words to describe things. It appears in From A-Z. Symbolized by the sounds of words.	
Origin spore: This gives all Animalians the ability to speak in their original animal languages. Appears in Alex's Secret Code. Symbolized by a chain.	
Speech spore: Causes Animalians to lose their ability to speak. Appears in Speechless In Animalia. Symbolized by a mouth that switches people's voices.	
Stability spore: This causes earthquakes. Appears in Being Peter Applebottom. Symbolized by measuring scales.	
Peace spore: This causes turmoil amongst Animalians. Appears in What's The Good Word. The only spore in which something other than what was found in it was used to undo the adverse effect the spore caused (Zoe's apology letter to Tyrannicus, which she wrote with a pen that was found in the spore).
Agreement spore: Causes Animalians to disagree with each other. Appears in The Dragon and The Night. Symbolized by an agreement contract.	
Intelligence spore: This causes Livingston and Allegra to switch intelligence. Appears in Brain Drain. Symbolized by tiny orbs.
Superspore: Also known as the Corespore of miracles. Completely heals the Core.

Production
The series is computer-animated, and 40 half-hour episodes were produced by Animalia Productions, based at Village Roadshow Studios in Queensland, and Australian visual effects companies Photon VFX, and Iloura Digital Pictures. The animation was rendered by Autodesk Maya.

Development
The series was first conceived in 1999 when Australian producer Ewan Burnett met with Base, and obtained the rights to an adaptation of the best-selling book. In early 2002, Burnett finalised the funding arrangements with Australian and international broadcast partners and investors, but the project was delayed when the British government revised the United Kingdom's taxation laws so that projects claiming special tax status had to be delivered in the financial year they were claimed. After three years of re-financing, Animalia began production in 2005.

The book on which the series was based is a picture book with each spread depicting an elaborate illustration in which every animal and object begins with a particular letter of the alphabet. As there was no coherent narrative or central characters, these were developed with the concept of a fantasy world where animals of all kinds intermingled and interacted becoming the central theme.

As the series was to be broadcast internationally, the alphabetical theme central to the book was dropped, as it was based on the English language alphabet and would lose its meaning if the program were dubbed into other languages.

Episodes
Two seasons, consisting of 20 episodes, have been made, and the first season was first broadcast in Australia on November 11, 2007, in the United Kingdom on November 19, 2007, and in the United States on PBS Kids Go! on January 5, 2008.

Season 1 (2007–08)
"Hello, We Must Be Going" (November 11, 2007)
"Goodbye, We Must Be Staying" (November 18, 2007)
"The Mist of Time" (November 25, 2007)
"Catcher In The Rhyme" (December 2, 2007)
"Forget Me Not" (December 16, 2007)
"Long Story Short" (December 23, 2007)
"Righting The Writing" (December 30, 2007)
"Butterfly Winter" (March 21, 2008)
"Speechless In Animalia" (April 4, 2008)
"Don Iguana" (April 11, 2008)
"Over & Beyond" (April 18, 2008)
"Being Peter Applebottom" (April 25, 2008)
"Animalia's Talent -O-Topia" (May 2, 2008)
"Brain Drain" (May 9, 2008)
"Save Our Swamp" (May 16, 2008)
"Tunnel Vision" (May 23, 2008)
"Iggy's Quest" (May 30, 2008)
"What's the Good Word?" (June 6, 2008)
"Alex's Secret Code" (June 13, 2008)
"Whistling in the Dark" (June 20, 2008)

Season 2 (2008)
"The Call to Action" (June 27, 2008)
"The World According to Iggy" (July 4, 2008)
"Nothing But the Truth" (July 11, 2008)
"The Dream Weavers" (July 18, 2008)
"Getting Over the Glums" (July 25, 2008)
"Tunnel King" (August 1, 2008)
"The Day Zoe Listened" (August 8, 2008)
"Alex's Treasure Island" (August 15, 2008)
"Taking a Guilt Trip" (August 22, 2008)
"The Animal Within" (August 29, 2008)
"The Mystery of the Missing Melba" (September 5, 2008)
"Scary Story Go Round" (September 12, 2008)
"The Ballad of the Creeper" (September 19, 2008)
"From 'A' to 'Z'" (September 26, 2008)
"The Dragon and the Night" (October 3, 2008)
"Tomorrow" (October 10, 2008)
"Guardians of the Core" (October 17, 2008)
"Paradise Found" (October 24, 2008)
"Back to the Present" (October 31, 2008)
"What the World Needs Now" (November 7, 2008)

Broadcast
The series began running in Australia on Network Ten at noon on Sundays beginning on November 11, 2007, and also on Nickelodeon since May 2008. In the United Kingdom it aired on CBBC on BBC One beginning on November 19, 2007. The series also aired in the United States on PBS Kids Go! beginning on January 5, 2008.

As of November 3, 2008, the show is also running on NRK in Norway. In Latinoamerica, the series began running on Animal Planet and later in Venezuela on Tves. In India, the show is broadcast on Cartoon Network India.

The other broadcast partners and investors in the series have not yet announced their broadcast schedules. The international networks involved in the production are: the BBC in the United Kingdom and CBC in Canada. The series will also be broadcast by SABC 2 in South Africa, Al Jazeera and in Israel.

Home media releases
On 30 June 2008, the first seven episodes of the series were released on DVD in the UK by 2Entertain, entitled Animalia: Where Animals Rule!.  
Eight episodes from season one were released on DVD and Blu-ray in the US by PorchLight Home Entertainment on 23 September 2008.  
On 8 September 2009, the first season was released on DVD by Imavision in Canada.

Reception

Critical response
A New York Times reviewer commented that the phrase based on the book by' may never have been stretched so far" in the creation of this TV series, while characterizing it as "weird" and "intermittently interesting."

Awards
In 2008, Animalia was nominated for BAFTA Children's Kids Vote Award.

In 2009, composer Christopher Elves won a Daytime Emmy award for Outstanding Music Direction and Composition for his work on Animalia'''s musical score.

APRA-AGSC Awards
The annual Screen Music Awards are presented by Australasian Performing Right Association (APRA) and Australian Guild of Screen Composers (AGSC).
2008 Best Music for Children's Television win for Animalia – "Butterfly Winter" composed by Christopher Elves.

Other merchandise
In 2008, BBC Children's Books and the Penguin Group published four books by Mandy Archer based on the series: the Animalia Colouring Book, the Animalia Sticker Activity Book, plus two storybooks, Animalia: Hello, we must be going and Animalia: Goodbye, we must be staying'' which were based upon the first and second episodes of the same name and adapted from the scripts by Tom Ruegger.  All four books have text and design by Children's Character Books and all but the colouring book are heavily illustrated with colour screenshots from the series.

References

External links
Animalia Official Website
 
Animalia Episode Guide
Official CBC Animalia Website
Official PBS Kids Animalia Website

2007 American television series debuts
2008 American television series endings
2000s American animated television series
2007 Australian television series debuts
2008 Australian television series endings
2000s Australian animated television series
2007 British television series debuts
2008 British television series endings
2000s British animated television series
2007 Canadian television series debuts
2008 Canadian television series endings
2000s Canadian animated television series
American children's animated adventure television series
American children's animated education television series
American children's animated fantasy television series
American computer-animated television series
Australian children's animated adventure television series
Australian children's animated education television series
Australian children's animated fantasy television series
Australian computer-animated television series
British children's animated adventure television series
British children's animated education television series
British children's animated fantasy television series
British computer-animated television series
Canadian children's animated adventure television series
Canadian children's animated education television series
Canadian children's animated fantasy television series
Canadian computer-animated television series
APRA Award winners
English-language television shows
BBC children's television shows
Australian Broadcasting Corporation original programming
Network 10 original programming
CBC Kids original programming
PBS original programming
PBS Kids shows
American television shows based on children's books
Australian television shows based on children's books
British television shows based on children's books
Canadian television shows based on children's books
Television series created by Tom Ruegger
Animated television series about apes
Animated television series about children
Animated television series about lions